Nesoryzomys fernandinae, also known as the Fernandina nesoryzomys, Fernandina rice rat, or Fernandina Galápagos mouse, is a species of rodent in the genus Nesoryzomys of family Cricetidae. It is found only on Fernandina in the Galápagos Islands (part of Ecuador), which it shares with N. narboroughi. Its natural habitat is subtropical or tropical dry shrubland. The conservation status of this endemic species continues to be investigated.

References

Literature cited
Duff, A. and Lawson, A. 2004. Mammals of the World: A checklist. New Haven, Connecticut: Yale University Press, 312 pp. 
Musser, G.G. and Carleton, M.D. 2005. Superfamily Muroidea. Pp. 894–1531 in Wilson, D.E. and Reeder, D.M. (eds.). Mammal Species of the World: a taxonomic and geographic reference. 3rd ed. Baltimore: The Johns Hopkins University Press, 2 vols., 2142 pp. 
Tirira, D., Dowler, R., Boada, C. and Weksler, M. 2008. . In IUCN. IUCN Red List of Threatened Species. Version 2009.2. <www.iucnredlist.org>. Downloaded on December 8, 2009.

Nesoryzomys
Endemic fauna of the Galápagos Islands
Mammals described in 1979
Taxonomy articles created by Polbot